A whodunit is a plot-driven story of the detective variety in which the puzzle is paramount.

Whodunit or Whodunnit may also refer to:

Music
"Whodunit" (song), a 1977 song by Tavares
"Who Dunnit?", a 1981 song by Genesis from the album Abacab

Television
Whodunnit? (UK game show), a 1972–1978 British television game show
Whodunnit? (U.S. game show), a 1979 American game show adaption of the British version
Whodunnit? (2013 TV series), a 2013 American reality competition television series
"Whodunnit?" (Is It Legal episode) (1995)

Other
Whodunnit (play), a 1977 play by Anthony Shaffer
Who-Dun-It?, a 1979 TRS-80 game
Who Dunit, a 1988 arcade video game
Who Dunnit, a 1995 pinball machine
Whodunit, a murder mystery boardgame published by Selchow and Righter in 1972

See also
 Who Done It? (disambiguation)